The Zuiko Digital 14–54 mm 2.8–3.5 is a Four Thirds System High Grade series lens by Olympus Corporation, initially sold in a kit with the Olympus E-1 camera body and also available separately. Three glass aspherical lenses are used in its optical formulation. It was positioned as an upgrade to the 14-45mm kit lens in terms of focal length range while having larger apertures. It was replaced as the premium kit lens by the Olympus Zuiko Digital ED 12-60mm f/2.8-4 SWD with the release of the E-3, and later was directly replaced by the Olympus Zuiko Digital 14-54mm f/2.8-3.5 II, which is more suited for mirror-up or mirrorless operation.

As with all Pro ("High Grade") series lenses by Olympus, it is sealed against water splashes, rain and dust.

References

External links 

 

14-54mm F2.8-3.5